Katara Cultural Village, also called Katara, is a cultural and commercial complex in Doha, Qatar, located on the eastern coast between West Bay and the Pearl. 

It was soft-opened in October 2010 during the Doha Tribeca Film Festival.

Overview

The complex comprises an open amphitheater, an opera house, a multi-purpose cinema, a multi-purpose conference hall, a beach (named Katara Beach), and a souq. A museum showcasing the country's maritime heritage was opened in November 2015. It is also site of AlBahie Auction House. It includes a  open-air shopping mall equipped with outdoor air conditioning, named 21 High st ("Katara Plaza" during development).

The buildings and facilities at Katara were deliberately  arranged in order to reflect the country's cultural and architectural heritage.

Cultural organizations

Katara hosts the following cultural organizations:
Al Gannas Association, an organization for hunting and falconry.
Al Bahie Auction House, dedicating to auctioning works of art.
Arab Postal Stamp Museum, a museum covering the postal history of 22 countries.
Bedaya Center, a career center dedicating to helping young Qataris find employment.
Brooq Magazine, a monthly cultural magazine established in 2003.
Doha Film Institute, a film production company that promotes local and regional filmmakers.
Forum of Arabic and International Relations, a cultural organization formed to promote intraregional relations and dialogue.
Katara Art Center, an art center founded in 2012.
Katara Art Studios, an organization that holds art workshops and organizes local art-related events.
Katara Beach Club, a sports and wellness club.
Katara Planetarium, a planetarium which has a capacity for 200 viewers and boasts a 22-meter display.
Poet Majles, a center dedicated to Arabic poetry.
Qatar Fine Arts Association, one the oldest artist societies in the country.
Qatar Music Academy, a government-sanctioned academy that trains students in music.
Qatar Philharmonic Orchestra, an orchestra that performs both western and Arabic music.
Qatar Museums Gallery-Katara.
Sout Al Khaleej, an Arabic-language public radio station.
Visual Art Center, which showcases the work of local artists and holds educational workshops.
Youth Hobbies Center, a youth center that holds workshops on activities such as photography, stamp collecting, animation and video games.

Events

Fath Al Kheir journey
Fath Al Kheir journey is a voyage organized by Katara management to promote Qatar's maritime heritage. The first voyage took place in the Persian Gulf from 22 November to 18 December, 2013. A second voyage was launched on 6 October, 2015. The ship was crewed by 40 Qataris in traditional attire and sailed around the Arabian Sea, with the key destinations being Oman and India. The Indian ambassador to Qatar hailed it as a milestone in the countries' bilateral relations

Katara Art Forum
A two-day discussion forum for the arts was inaugurated in Katara in 2014. An annual event, the forum features international and local researchers who deliver speeches on topics such as the history of Arab art and Arab art groups.

Aida
In October 2012, an event featuring Giuseppe Verdi's classic opera Aida was hosted in Katara's amphitheatre. It was the first opera to be held in Qatar. The Qatar Philharmonic Orchestra were featured in the opera, alongside at least 80 singers and 35 actors.

2021 FIFA Arab Cup Draw
The group stage draw for the 2021 FIFA Arab Cup took place on 27 April 2021 at the Katara's opera house.

Transport
Currently, the underground Katara Metro Station is under construction, having been launched during Phase 1. Once completed, it will be part of Doha Metro's Red Line North.

Development projects
Doha Bay crossing (also known as Sharq Crossing) is a causeway between 600 m and 1,300 m which will link Hamad International Airport with Katara. It is set for completion by 2021.

Management

Dr. Khalid Bin Ibrahim Al-Sulaiti is the General Manager of Katara Cultural village.

Gallery

References

External links

Event venues in Qatar
2010 establishments in Qatar
Qatari culture